Olaf Henning Thommessen (born 1 August 1966) is the Chief Executive Officer of SMB Norge, The Norwegian Association of Small & Medium Enterprises and a former politician for the Liberal Party.

Thommessen is a Roman Catholic of French and Norwegian descent. Olaf's mother, Annette Hilda Eliane Thommessen, née Arosa (1932–1994), was a French national, and his father was Henrik Peter Thommessen, a son of Olaf D. Thommessen, grandson of Anne and Rolf Thommessen and great-grandson of Ola Thommessen. Annette and Henrik Thommessen were married from 1953–1978.

Personal life
In 1996, Thommessen married to the Stockholm, Sweden-born model-actress Vendela, with whom he has two children. The couple separated in 2007, and Vendela and the children live in Nesodden.

Career
Thommessen was elected to the central board of the Liberal Party in 2002. In 2004 he became second deputy leader of the party. He withdrew in 2007. He served as a deputy representative to the Parliament of Norway from Oslo during the term 2005–2009, and was also a member of Oslo city council.

In 2007 he released the autobiography På innsiden utenfor.

References

1966 births
Living people
Norwegian people of French descent
Norwegian businesspeople
Norwegian Roman Catholics
Politicians from Oslo
Liberal Party (Norway) politicians
Deputy members of the Storting
Norwegian autobiographers